Iolaus sappirus, the jewel sapphire, is a butterfly in the family Lycaenidae. The species was first described by Hamilton Herbert Druce in 1902. It is found in Sierra Leone, Liberia, Ivory Coast, Ghana, Nigeria (the western part of the country and the Cross River loop), Cameroon, the Republic of the Congo and the Democratic Republic of the Congo (Kivu and Tshopo). The habitat consists of forests.

References

External links

Die Gross-Schmetterlinge der Erde 13: Die Afrikanischen Tagfalter. Plate XIII 68 d, e

Butterflies described in 1902
Iolaus (butterfly)